Hubert Vos (February 15, 1855 – January 8, 1935) was a Dutch painter who was born Josephus Hubertus Vos in Maastricht.  He studied at the Académie Royale des Beaux-Arts in Brussels and with Fernand Cormon in Paris. He exhibited widely in Paris, Amsterdam, Brussels, Dresden and Munich.  From 1885 to 1892, he worked in England, where he exhibited at the Royal Academy between 1888 and 1891.  He was a member of the Royal Society of British Artists.

Career

In 1877, he married Aline Watteau, family of the famous French rococopainter Jean Antoine Watteau. They had two children: a daughter, Isolde (1881 - 1950) and a son, Marius (1883 - 1974). His second wife was Eleanor Kaikilani Coney, of Hawaiian, Chinese, and American descent. They married in 1897 and had one daughter, Margueritte.  In 1898, he visited Hawaii, where he painted the local people. In that same year, Vos traveled to Korea, where he completed at least three paintings in duplicate.  In each case, he left one copy in Korea and kept one copy. The paintings are a life-sized portrait of Emperor Gojong, a portrait of Min Sangho (1870–1933), and a landscape of Seoul. The copies left in Korea hung in the Deoksugung Palace until all except the landscape of Seoul, were destroyed by fire in 1904. Vos visited China in 1899 and painted portraits of prominent leaders. Empress Dowager Cixi (Tzu Hsi), whose portrait had been painted in oil by the American artist Katharine Carl, saw these portraits and invited Vos to visit China in 1905. He did one portrait of her which is still displayed in the Summer Palace, then after he got back to New York, finished another portrait which he had started in China.  This was displayed at the Paris Salon, then acquired by Grenville L. Winthrop and given to the Fogg Museum at Harvard.

In addition to portraits and landscapes, Vos is known for his interior scenes and still-life paintings of Chinese porcelains. The gifts from Empress Dowager Cixi are favorite objects of the still-life paintings. He died in New York City in 1935.

The Louvre Museum (Paris, France), Bonnefanten Museum (Maastricht, Netherlands), the Chicago History Museum, the Fogg Art Museum (Harvard University), the Honolulu Museum of Art, the Luxembourg Palace (Paris), the Metropolitan Museum of Art, Capital Museum (Beijing), and the Smithsonian American Art Museum are among the public collections holding works by Hubert Vos. Vos was elected to The Lambs theatrical club in 1895. Three of his portraits are displayed in the club collection in Manhattan.

Selected works

References
 Virginia Anderson, "'A Semi-Chinese Picture': Hubert Vos and the Empress Dowager of China," Proceedings and Other Publications  (2012). 
 Ellis, George R. and Marcia Morse, A Hawaii Treasury, Masterpieces from the Honolulu Academy of Arts, Tokyo, Asahi Shimbun, 2000, 150, 223-4.
 Forbes, David W., "Encounters with Paradise: Views of Hawaii and its People, 1778-1941", Honolulu Academy of Arts, 1992, 220-223.
 Luke SK Kwong, "No Shadows," History Today 50 (2000):  42-43. 
 Severson, Don R. Finding Paradise: Island Art in Private Collections, University of Hawaii Press, 2002, p. 104-5.
 Wood, Christopher, Victorian Painters, 3rd ed., revised, Woodbridge, Suffolk, 1995.

External links
 Painting an Empress; Hubert Vos, K.C.D.D., the First Man to Portray the Dowager Empress of China The New York Times, December 17, 1905, Sunday]
 Hubert Vos in AskArt.com
 Smithsonian American Art Museum, Art Inventories Catalog

Footnotes

1855 births
1935 deaths
Dutch portrait painters
Dutch landscape painters
Dutch still life painters
Artists from Maastricht
Academic art
19th-century Dutch painters
Dutch male painters
20th-century Dutch painters
19th-century Dutch male artists
20th-century Dutch male artists